Eulima translucida is a species of sea snail, a marine gastropod mollusk in the family Eulimidae. The species is one of a number within the genus Eulima.

References

 Smith, E.A. (1901) On South African marine shells, with descriptions of new species. Journal of Conchology, 10, 104–116, 1 pl. page(s): 109, pl. 1, fig. 11.

External links
 To World Register of Marine Species

translucida
Gastropods described in 1901